Hardy Township is one of the fourteen townships of Holmes County, Ohio, United States. As of the 2010 census the population was 5,649, of whom 2,624 lived in the unincorporated portion of the township.

Geography
Located at the center of the county, it borders the following townships:
Prairie Township - north
Salt Creek Township - northeast
Berlin Township - east
Mechanic Township - southeast
Killbuck Township - southwest
Monroe Township - west

The village of Millersburg, the county seat of Holmes County, is located in central Hardy Township.

Name and history
It is the only Hardy Township statewide.

Government
The township is governed by a three-member board of trustees, who are elected in November of odd-numbered years to a four-year term beginning on the following January 1. Two are elected in the year after the presidential election and one is elected in the year before it. There is also an elected township fiscal officer, who serves a four-year term beginning on April 1 of the year after the election, which is held in November of the year before the presidential election. Vacancies in the fiscal officership or on the board of trustees are filled by the remaining trustees.

References

External links
County website

Townships in Holmes County, Ohio
Townships in Ohio